La Balme-de-Thuy is a commune in the Haute-Savoie department in the Auvergne-Rhône-Alpes region in south-eastern France.

Geography
The Fier flows westward through the middle of the commune and forms part of its western border.

See also
Communes of the Haute-Savoie department

References

Communes of Haute-Savoie